This list of first-class cricket records itemises some record team and individual performances in first-class cricket.  The list is necessarily selective, since it is in cricket's nature to generate copious records and statistics.  Both instance records (such as highest team and individual scores, lowest team scores and record margins of victory) and season and career records (such as most runs or wickets in a season, and most runs or wickets in a career) are included.

Officially, there was no "first-class cricket" in Great Britain before 1895 or in the rest of the world before 1947 (see First-class cricket for details of the official rulings). The performances noted in this article include several which occurred in earlier years but it is understood that all were achieved in matches that are retrospectively recognised by most historians or statisticians as first-class (i.e., unofficially so). Some matches have not been universally accepted as first-class for statistical purposes and there are thus variations in published cricket statistics, mainly because of the different proposals that have been made for the starting date of the statistical records, ranging from the 17th century to 1895.

Records shown here are quoted by either CricketArchive or Wisden Cricketers' Almanack, unless otherwise stated.

Notation 
Team notation
 300–3 indicates that a team scored 300 runs for three wickets and the innings was closed, either due to a successful run chase or if no playing time remained.
 300-3d indicates that a team scored 300 runs for three wickets, and declared its innings closed.
 300 indicates that a team scored 300 runs and was all out.

Batting Notation
 100 indicates that a batsman scored 100 runs and was out.
 100* indicates that a batsman scored 100 runs and was not out.
 100* against a partnership means that the two batsmen added 100 runs to the team's total, and neither of them was out.

Bowling Notation
 5–100 indicates that a bowler captured 5 wickets while conceding 100 runs.

Team records

Team scoring records

Greatest margins of victory by an innings 
Qualification: Innings and 550 runs.

Greatest margins of victory by runs 
Qualification: 575 runs.

Victory without losing a wicket

Ties 

There have been 33 ties in first-class cricket since 1948.  Before then, a tie was sometimes declared where the scores were level when scheduled play ended, but the side batting last still had wickets in hand.  Matches where this happens are considered a draw today, and a tie is now recognised only where the scores are level and the side batting fourth is dismissed.

Highest totals 
Qualification: 900.

Lowest totals 
Qualification: 15.

Highest totals in the fourth innings 
Qualification: 510.

Individual records

Individual records (batting)

Highest individual score 

The highest individual score in first-class cricket is 501* scored by Brian Lara for Warwickshire in 1994. There have been ten other scores of 400 or more, including another by Lara and two by Bill Ponsford.

Scorecards began to be kept regularly from the 1772 season which is now seen as the commencement of the statistical first-class record, though historical first-class cricket began a century earlier. There is no certainty of a complete statistical record of any season until well into the 19th century, which is why Roy Webber and others have been reluctant to begin their first-class cricket statistics before the 1864 season, notwithstanding the official commencement of first-class cricket in 1895.

The earliest century definitely recorded in a match generally regarded as first-class is the 136 scored by John Small in the 1775 season (see below). There can be little doubt that centuries had been scored before this but the records are either lost or the known details are incomplete. Some of the main instances of high scoring prior to 1772 are as follows:

 1744 – John Harris scored 47 for Slindon v. London at the Artillery Ground in the match which has left the oldest known scorecard. This is the earliest match from which individual scores are known. The oldest known team scores date from 1731.
 1745 – Richard Newland scored 88 for All-England v. Kent at the Artillery Ground, almost certainly in the second innings of the match, but there is a slight possibility that it was his match total. This is the highest known score recorded prior to the introduction c.1760 of the pitched delivery and the straight bat.
 1767 – two Hampshire batsmen (believed to have been Tom Sueter and either George Leer or Edward "Curry" Aburrow) recorded a first-wicket partnership of 192 against Surrey, but there is no record of their individual scores, although at least one of the batsmen probably made a personal century. It is the earliest known century partnership.
 1768 – John Small scored "above seven score notches" for Hampshire v Kent, but it is not known if this was his match total or his performance in the second innings. If it was his match total, he could still have made a century in either innings.
 1769 – John Minshull (listed as "J. Minchin" on the scorecard) scored the earliest century in all classes of cricket of which there is a definite record: he made 107 for Duke of Dorset's XI v Wrotham at Sevenoaks Vine (although the location is not certain), but the match is generally considered a minor one.

The following individual scores in first-class matches from 1772 are progressively the highest definitely recorded on contemporary scorecards:
 78 – John Small for Hampshire v All-England at Broadhalfpenny Down in 1772. This was the highest score recorded in the earliest match now designated first-class by some statisticians and remained the highest known score through the 1772 season.
 88 – William Yalden for Surrey v Hampshire at Broadhalfpenny Down in 1773.
 95 – Joseph Miller for Kent v Hampshire at Sevenoaks Vine in 1774.
 136 – John Small for Hampshire v Surrey at Broadhalfpenny Down in 1775. This is the earliest known century in a first-class match. Small's colleague Richard Nyren scored 98 in the same innings so they both beat Miller's score.
 167 – James Aylward for Hampshire v All-England at Sevenoaks Vine in 1777.
 170 – Lord Frederick Beauclerk for Homerton v Montpelier at Aram's New Ground in 1806. This match is considered a minor one in the opinion of some statisticians but several other matches involving either team are rated first-class. Its inclusion in Scores and Biographies is significant and it is first-class on that basis.
 278 – William Ward for Marylebone Cricket Club (MCC) v Norfolk at Lord's in 1820. Again, there is some doubt among certain statisticians about the status of Norfolk but the match's inclusion in Scores and Biographies is significant.

Ward's record survived for 56 years until W. G. Grace scored the first triple-century in first-class cricket in 1876. The table below shows the progressive world record from 1876.

Most runs in a career 
Qualification: 40,000.

Highest career average 

Qualification: 20,000 runs, average 54.

The highest first-class batting career average of all is 207.00, by Norman Callaway, who aged 18 scored 207 in his only first-class innings on his début for New South Wales against Queensland in 1914–15.  He died during the Second Battle of Bullecourt in 1917.

Most runs in a season

Most runs in an over

High proportion of team's runs 
It is not unusual for a batsman to dominate the scoring while he is at the wicket; it is more unusual for a batsman to dominate his side's completed total if they are all out.

The lowest completed first-class innings to include a fifty is Indians' 66 against Yorkshire at Harrogate in 1932, to which Nazir Ali contributed 52 (78.79%) and his partners 9 (there were 5 extras).

The lowest completed first-class innings to include a century is Nottinghamshire's 143 against Hampshire at Bournemouth in 1981, to which Clive Rice contributed 105* (73.4%) and his partners 35 (there were 3 extras) and Gujranwala's 143 against Bahawalpur at Bahawalpur in 2001–02, to which Rizwan Malik contributed 100* (69.93%) and his partners 41 (there were 2 extras).

The lowest completed first-class innings to include a double-century is Namibia's 282 against Kenya at Sharjah in January 2008, to which Gerrie Snyman contributed 230 (81.56%) and his partners 43 (there were 9 extras).

The lowest completed first-class innings to include a triple century is the Rest's 387 against Hindus at Bombay in 1943–44, to which Vijay Hazare contributed 309 (79.84%) and his partners 59 (there were 19 extras).

The lowest completed first-class total to include a score of 350 is Otago's 500 against Canterbury at Christchurch in 1952–53, to which opener Bert Sutcliffe contributed 385 (77.0%) and his partners 86 (there were 29 extras).

The highest percentage of runs scored in any completed innings is 83.43% by Glenn Turner who scored 141* out of Worcestershire's 169 against Glamorgan at Swansea in 1977. The remaining batsmen scored 27 and there was one extra.

In the 2007 English cricket season, Mark Ramprakash scored a record 30.02% of Surrey's runs excluding extras.  In 16 matches he scored 2,026 runs at an average of 101.30, while his team mates managed 4,721 between them at an average of 26.08.

Conversely, the highest completed first-class innings not to include an individual century is 671 for nine declared by Surrey against Kent at Beckenham in 2022. Seven batters passed 50, and the top score was Ollie Pope's 96.

Most boundaries in an innings 
Qualification: 55 boundaries.

Most triple-centuries 
Qualification: 3.  Includes all scores of 300 or more. Entries in bold are for batsmen still playing first-class cricket.

Most double-centuries 
Qualification: 15.  Includes all scores of 200 or more.

Most centuries 

Qualification: 115.

Ineffective batsmen 
Many cricketers with short first-class careers fail to ever score a run, and finish with a batting average of 0.00. Seymour Clark (a wicket-keeper for Somerset in the 1930 season) is believed to hold the record for most innings in a scoreless career with nine innings in his five matches, including seven ducks. The record for most matches in a career without ever scoring is believed to belong to John Howarth (a Nottinghamshire fast-medium bowler in the 1960s), whose thirteen matches included seven innings and four ducks.

The longest sequence of consecutive scoreless innings is 12 by Mark Robinson for Northamptonshire in 1990, whose scores that season were 1*, 0*, 1, 0, 0*, 0*, 0*, 0*, 0*, 0, 0, 0, 0*, 0*, 0 and 1*.

The most consecutive single-figure innings by a batsman is 71, which has occurred twice. The first occurrence was by Jem Shaw who played chiefly for Nottinghamshire and the All England Eleven between his first-class debut on 26 June 1865 against Surrey with a score of 9, which he did not surpass until scoring 15 in the second innings of his last match of 1870 for “Richard Daft’s XI” against the United North of England Eleven. This was equalled by Eric Hollies of Warwickshire and England between 20 July 1948, when he made 12 not out against Glamorgan, and 16 August 1950, when he made 14 against Nottinghamshire. Hollies also holds the record for most consecutive innings without reaching 20, playing a total of 284 innings between 23 August 1939 when he made 22 against Gloucestershire and 19 May 1954, when he almost doubled his previous highest first-class score in making 47 against Sussex. Billy Bestwick of Derbyshire did not reach 20 in his last 258 first-class innings after making 20 against Warwickshire on 9 August 1906.

The lowest career batting average by a player with more than fifty first-class matches is almost certainly 2.63 by Francis McHugh of Yorkshire (three matches) and Gloucestershire (92 matches) between 1949 and 1956. McHugh batted in 111 innings for only 179 runs, with only four double figure scores. No other regular first-class cricketer is known to have had a batting average of under 3.00.

Individual records (bowling)

Most wickets in a career 
Qualification: 2,400.

Most wickets in a season 
Qualification: 275 wickets.

Best figures in an innings 

The most wickets possible in an eleven-a-side match is ten, and this has been achieved on a number of occasions.  The first to do so was Edmund Hinkly in 1848 for Kent v England at Lord's.  Perhaps the most famous early instance was two years later, when John Wisden, playing for the North of England v South of England at Lord's in 1850, clean bowled all ten South batsmen.  In these early matches, the number of runs scored off each bowler was not recorded.  The only other all-ten analysis not to contain any direct assistance from a fielder was by Eric Hollies, who got seven Nottinghamshire batsman out clean bowled and three leg before wicket in his ten for 49 for Warwickshire v Nottinghamshire at Edgbaston, Birmingham in 1946.

The cheapest all-ten (and therefore the best innings bowling analysis in first-class cricket) was achieved by Hedley Verity in 1932 at Headingley, when he took ten for 10 for Yorkshire against Nottinghamshire.  The most expensive all-ten recorded was ten for 175 by Eddie Hemmings playing for a touring International XI against a West Indies XI at Sabina Park, Kingston, Jamaica in 1982.

The only bowlers to take all ten wickets in an innings more than once were Tich Freeman (three times in 1929, 1930 and 1931), John Wisden (twice, in 1850 and 1851), Vyell Walker (1859 and 1865), Hedley Verity (twice, 1931 and 1932), and Jim Laker (twice, both against the 1956 Australians). W. G. Grace also achieved a ten-for analysis twice, in 1873 and 1886; on the first occasion, he also scored a century, but the second occasion was in a twelve-a-side match.

Best figures in a match 
The most wickets ever taken in a first-class match is nineteen, by Jim Laker for England against Australia at Old Trafford, Manchester in 1956, in the fourth Test match of that year's Ashes series.  His figures were nine for 37 in Australia's first innings, and ten for 53 in their second.

Laker's feat has never been paralleled in first-class cricket.  Eighteen wickets in a match was achieved by William Lillywhite for eleven Players against sixteen Gentlemen at Lord's in 1837, and by Henry Arkwright for MCC against Kent in a 12-a-side match at Canterbury in 1861, but seventeen is the most otherwise recorded in an eleven-a-side match.  Apart from Laker's, there have only been two instances of seventeen wickets in a match since World War II, by John Davison for Canada against United States of America in an ICC Intercontinental Cup match in 2004, and Kyle Abbott for Hampshire against Somerset in the First Division of the County Championship in 2019.

Five wickets in an innings 
Individual bowlers take great credit if they can capture five or more wickets in an innings.  The earliest known instance of this was by William Bullen, who bowled five batsmen out when playing for All-England v Hampshire at Sevenoaks Vine in 1774.  Scorecards were still uncommon at the time and bowling analyses were incomplete; bowlers were only credited with "bowled" victims, catches being awarded to the fielder only.

Tich Freeman took five wickets in an innings a record 386 times. Wilfred Rhodes achieved it 287 times.

Ten wickets in a match 
It is a notable achievement for a bowler to capture 10 wickets in a match, and the feat is usually highlighted in career statistics.  The earliest known instance was by Thomas Brett of Hampshire against Surrey at Laleham Burway in 1775.  Brett's victims were "all bowled" as he was not credited with wickets falling to catches.  He took seven in the first innings and four in the second (but Surrey still won by 69 runs).

Tich Freeman took ten wickets in a match a record 140 times. Charlie Parker achieved it 91 times.

Hat-tricks 
A hat-trick is when a bowler takes three wickets from three consecutive deliveries. Doug Wright achieved the most hat-tricks in first-class cricket with seven. Tom Goddard and Charlie Parker each took six. In 2019–20, Ravi Yadav uniquely took a hat-trick in his first over on first-class debut, for Madhya Pradesh against Uttar Pradesh in the Ranji Trophy.

In 1907, Albert Trott of Middlesex took four wickets in four balls, and another hat-trick, in the same Somerset innings.  In 1963–64, Joginder Rao playing for Services took two hat-tricks in the same Northern Punjab innings during his second first-class match, after having also taken a hat-trick in his début match.  Other instances of two hat-tricks in a match have been achieved by Alfred Shaw (in 1884), Jimmy Matthews (1912 in a Test match), Charlie Parker (1924), Roly Jenkins (1949), Amin Lakhani (1978–79), and Mitchell Starc (2017-18).

Four wickets in four balls is a rarer achievement, first done by Joseph Wells (father of science fiction author H. G. Wells) for Kent against Sussex in 1862. Alan Walker, for Nottinghamshire in 1956, uniquely took the last wicket of Leicestershire's first innings, and a hat-trick with the first three balls of their second innings. Bob Crisp is the only player to take four wickets in four balls on two occasions.

Five wickets in five balls has never been achieved - one of the closest instances coming in 1925, when CWL Parker struck the stumps with five successive deliveries for Gloucestershire against Yorkshire. The second, however, was called a no-ball, so only four wickets were actually taken, including the hat-trick from the 3rd to 5th deliveries.  Five wickets in six balls has been achieved five times, by Bill Copson for Derbyshire against Warwickshire in 1937, by William Henderson for North East Transvaal against Orange Free State at Bloemfontein in 1937–38, by Pat Pocock for Surrey against Sussex at Eastbourne in 1972, by Yasir Arafat for Rawalpindi against Faisalabad at Rawalpindi in 2004–05, and by Neil Wagner for Otago against Wellington in 2010–11. Wagner took five wickets in the over, a world's first. Pocock's spell also included six wickets in nine balls and seven wickets in eleven balls, both records.

Individual records (all-rounders) 
An all-rounder excels at more than one discipline, usually both batting and bowling. Wicket-keeping all-rounders are effective batsmen and effective wicket-keepers.

Career all-rounders 
Qualification: 22,000 runs and 1,100 wickets.

Career wicket-keeping all-rounders 
Qualification: 20,000 runs and 1,000 dismissals.

Individual records (wicket-keepers)

Most dismissals (catches plus stumpings) in a career 
Qualification: 1,100.

Most stumpings in a career 
Qualification: 300.

Individual records (fielding)

Most catches in a career 
Qualification: 640 catches.

Individual records (other)

Most matches played 
Qualification: 750.

Partnership records

Highest partnerships 
Qualification: 480.

References 
Linked scorecards are from the Cricket Archive or from ESPN CricInfo.

Further reading 
Matthew Engel (ed.), Wisden Cricketers' Almanack 2006, John Wisden & Co., 
Scyld Berry (ed.), Wisden Cricketers' Almanack 2008, John Wisden & Co., 
Scyld Berry (ed.), Wisden Cricketers' Almanack 2010, John Wisden & Co., 
Scyld Berry (ed.), Wisden Cricketers' Almanack 2011, John Wisden & Co.,

External links 
Cricket Archive
ESPNcricinfo first-class records

Cricket-related lists